State Road 386 (NM 386) is a  state highway in the US state of New Mexico. NM 386's southern terminus is at a loop of NM 386 in Anton Chico, and the northern terminus is at U.S. Route 84 (US 84) northwest of Dilia.

Major intersections

See also

References

386
Transportation in Guadalupe County, New Mexico
Transportation in San Miguel County, New Mexico